Hasan Shahid Suhrawardy (24 October 1890 – 3 March 1965), also known as Shahid Suhrawardy was a Bengali diplomat, translator, poet and art critic.

Family and education

Shahid Suhrawardy's father, Sir Zahid Suhrawardy, was a Justice of the Calcutta High Court and his younger brother Huseyn Shaheed Suhrawardy was a politician and 5th Prime Minister of Pakistan. Shaista Suhrawardy Ikramullah, his first cousin, was an intellectual and diplomat.

Shahid Suhrawardy obtained a BA (Hons) degree in English from the University of Calcutta in 1909, as a student of the Scottish Churches College. In 1913, he graduated from Oxford University in Law.

During his time at Oxford he became friends with Robert Bridges, D. H. Lawrence and R.C. Trevelyan.

Career
In 1914, Suhrawardy went on to Russia on a scholarship to further study the Russian language of which he already had a certain degree of mastery. He stayed on becoming Professor of English at Moscow University and was caught in the Russian Revolution (1917). Suhrawardy returned to Russia to work and tour with the Moscow Art Theatre (1926–29) and then later came to reside in Paris with Professor Kalitinsky and his wife Maria Nikolaevna Germanova, a famous tragic actress of Russia in her time. In Paris, he served as the editor of the Fine Art Section of the League of Nations. He was also associated with editing of a quarterly journal on Byzantian art published from Prague.

Following his return to the sub-continent in 1932, Osmania University in Hyderabad commissioned him to write an introductory book on the Islamic art of different countries of the world. Later, he came to Visva-Bharati University at Rabindranath Tagore's invitation and researched on Iranian art in Santiniketan as the Nizam Professor. He was an art-critic for The Statesman and was instrumental in bringing the work of Bengali painter Jamini Roy to the notice of the public.

Suhrawardy was a member of the Bengal Public Service Commission during 1943–46. Following the creation of Pakistan in 1947, he went to Karachi at the end of 1948. He was active as a member of the Federal Public Service Commission of Pakistan till 1952. He served as a guest lecturer of Oriental Art for two years at Columbia University commencing in 1952. At that time a new mansion for UNESCO was built in Paris and a selection committee was formed with international art-specialists to choose paintings that would decorate it in a befitting manner with artwork. Suhrawardy was a member of this committee.

Suhrawardy also worked as a diplomat. He was an ambassador of Pakistan to Spain, Morocco, Tunisia and the Vatican from 1954 onwards. He was very close to Jawaharlal Nehru and Sudhindranath Dutta. He was proficient in many languages including Russian, Cantonese, Aramaic, Greek, Italian, Spanish, French.

Suhrawardy retired in 1959 and returned to Pakistan and took no active part in public life.

Suhrawardy was the Founder President of Pakistan PEN, a sister organisation of the International Affiliation of Writers Guilds. His anthology titled Essays in Verse of his work was published in 1962 from Dhaka. It included the poems he had written during his stay at Oxford and works that he had published in different English and American literary journals. His poems embody the spirit of the different avant-garde poetic movements of Europe. The book itself is divided into three parts: New Poems, Early Poems and An Oldman's Songs, which reflect elegant and tender thoughts.

Bibliography 
Suhrawardy earned fame as Rani Bagiswari Professor of Fine Arts at the University of Calcutta during 1932–43. A compilation of his famous lectures named Prefaces: Lectures on Art Subjects was published by the university. Other works by him worth mentioning are: The Art of Jamini Ray; Mussalman Culture (translated from the original Russian work by Vasily Bartold); A Handbook of Mussalman Art; The Art of the Mussalmans in Spain; and Wanderings of a Gourmet. The first of these books a pioneering work of art-criticism written in a lucid style. He is also known to have written a book on cookery and another translating the poems of Li Houzhu.

Death 
Shahid Suhrawardy died on 5 December 1963 in Lebanon.

References

External links
 Forgotten pride of our subcontinent
 Hasan Shahid Suhrawardy (1890–1965), Poet and critic, National Portrait Gallery, London

1890 births
1965 deaths
Bengali Muslims
People from Midnapore
Bengali writers
20th-century Bengali poets
Hasan Shahid
Pakistani people of Bengali descent
English-language poets from Pakistan
Scottish Church College alumni
University of Calcutta alumni
Alumni of the University of Oxford
Academic staff of Moscow State University
Academic staff of Saint Petersburg State University
Academic staff of Charles University
Academic staff of the University of Calcutta
Columbia University faculty
Pakistani writers
Ambassadors of Pakistan to Spain
Ambassadors of Pakistan to Morocco
Ambassadors of Pakistan to Tunisia
Ambassadors of Pakistan to the Holy See
Ambassadors of Pakistan to the Soviet Union
Russian–Urdu translators
19th-century Bengalis
20th-century Bengalis
Scholars from West Bengal